The eyeless golden-line fish or blind golden-line barbel (Sinocyclocheilus anophthalmus) is a species of ray-finned fish in the family Cyprinidae.
It is a cave-dwelling, blind species only known from the Yiliang County, Yunnan, China. Its maximum length is  SL.

References

anophthalmus
Cave fish
Endemic fauna of Yunnan
Freshwater fish of China
Fish described in 1988
Taxonomy articles created by Polbot